Vitaliy Volodymyrovych Lukyanenko (born 15 May 1978) is a Ukrainian biathlete, cross-country skier, and Paralympian.

He is classified B3 (under 10% functional vision), and competes in the visually impaired category.

He competed at the 2022 Winter Paralympics, winning a gold medal in the men's 6 kilometres and 10 kilometres biathlon events.

Career 
Lukyanenko began skiing at age ten.

At the 2002 Winter Paralympics he competed in cross-country skiing and biathlon. In cross-country skiing, he took the bronze medal in the 5 km classical technique, B3. He placed 16th in the 20 km free technique, 4th in the 10 km free technique, B3, and 5th in the men's relay. In biathlon, he placed 11th in the 7.5 km free technique, blind.

Lukyanenko competed in biathlon and cross-country skiing at the 2006 Winter Paralympics. In cross-country skiing he took the bronze in the men's relay with Volodymyr Ivanov, Vladyslav Morozov, and Oleh Munts. He placed 7th in the men's 5 km, visually impaired. In biathlon, he took the gold medal in 12.5 km, and silver in 7.5 km, blind.

Lukyanenko competed in biathlon and cross-country skiing at the 2010 Winter Paralympics in Vancouver, Canada. In cross-country skiing he won silver in the men's relay, open with Ivanov, Grygorii Vovchynskyi, and Iurii Kostiuk. He placed 5th in the men's 1 km sprint, visually impaired. In biathlon, he took the bronze medal in the 12.5 km, and the gold medal in the men's 3 km pursuit, visually impaired. His guide at the 2002, 2006, and 2010 Paralympics was Volodymyr Ivanov.

In biathlon, he won the gold medals in the men's 6 km and 10 kilometres visually impaired events, and a silver medal in the 12.5 kilometres visually impaired event at the 2022 Winter Paralympics held in Beijing, China.

Personal life 
Lukyanenko was born in Sumy. He has two daughters.

References

External links 
 

Ukrainian male cross-country skiers
Ukrainian male biathletes
Paralympic biathletes of Ukraine
Paralympic cross-country skiers of Ukraine
Biathletes at the 2002 Winter Paralympics
Biathletes at the 2006 Winter Paralympics
Biathletes at the 2010 Winter Paralympics
Biathletes at the 2014 Winter Paralympics
Biathletes at the 2018 Winter Paralympics
Biathletes at the 2022 Winter Paralympics
Cross-country skiers at the 2002 Winter Paralympics
Cross-country skiers at the 2006 Winter Paralympics
Cross-country skiers at the 2010 Winter Paralympics
Cross-country skiers at the 2014 Winter Paralympics
Paralympic gold medalists for Ukraine
Paralympic silver medalists for Ukraine
Paralympic bronze medalists for Ukraine
1978 births
Living people
Sportspeople from Sumy
Medalists at the 2002 Winter Paralympics
Medalists at the 2006 Winter Paralympics
Medalists at the 2010 Winter Paralympics
Medalists at the 2014 Winter Paralympics
Medalists at the 2018 Winter Paralympics
Medalists at the 2022 Winter Paralympics
Ukrainian blind people
Visually impaired category Paralympic competitors
Paralympic medalists in cross-country skiing
Paralympic medalists in biathlon
20th-century Ukrainian people
21st-century Ukrainian people